The 1970 Little All-America college football team is composed of college football players from small colleges and universities who were selected by the Associated Press (AP) as the best players at each position. For 1970, the AP selected three teams, each team having separate offensive and defensive platoons.

Jim Lindsey of Abilene Christian was selected as the first-team quarterback. During his time at Abilene Christian, he became college football's all-time passing leader, completing 642 of 1,237 passes for 8,521 yards and 61 touchdowns. Lindsey went on to play in the Canadian Football League.

Running back Leon Burns of Long Beach State was the only player to win first-team honors in both 1969 and 1970. He rushed for 1,033 yards in 1970, down from his 1969 totals of 1,659 yards and 27 touchdowns.

Joe Profit of Northeast Louisiana broke the Gulf Coast Conference all-time rushing record and was named to the conference's all-decade team for the 1960s. He was drafted by the Atlanta Falcons in the first round (seventh overall pick) of the 1971 NFL Draft.

Junior running back Leon McQuay of Tampa rushed for 1,362 yards, added 396 yards on kickoff returns, and scored 20 touchdowns. He skipped his senior season to play in the Canadian Football League (CFL). He was a CFL All-Star in 1971.

First team

Offense
 Quarterback - Jim Lindsey (senior, 5'11", 185 pounds), Abilene Christian
 Running back - Leon Burns (senior, 6'1", 228 pounds), Long Beach State
 Running back - Leon McQuay (junior, 5'10", 202 pounds), Tampa
 Running back - Joe Profit (senior, 6'0", 206 pounds), Northeast Louisiana
 End - John Curtis (senior, 6'3", 210 pounds), Springfield
 End - Harold “Red” Roberts (senior, 6'1", 190 pounds), Austin Peay
 Tackle - Vernon Holland (senior, 6'6", 268 pounds), Tennessee State
 Tackle - Melvin Holmes (senior, 6'4", 250 pouds), North Carolina A&T
 Guard - Bill Phillips (junior, 6'2", 248 pounds), Arkansas State
 Guard - Conway Hayman (senior, 6'3", 255 pounds), Delaware
 Center - Jimmy Champion (senior, 6'2", 215 pounds), Jacksonville State

Defense
 Defensive end - Lawrence Brame (senior, 6'1", 212 pounds), Western Kentucky
 Defensive end - Richard Harris (senior, 6'5", 265 pounds), Grambling
 Defensive tackle - Fred Carter (senior, 6'1", 260 pounds), Alcorn A&M
 Defensive tacke - Charles Roundtree (senior, 6'1, 274 pounds), Grambling
 Middle guard - Margarito Guerrero (senior, 6'0", 245 pounds), Texas A&I
 Linebacker - Ronnie Hornsby (senior, 6'3", 230 pounds), Southeastern Louisiana
 Linebacker - Len Pettigrew (senior, 6'4", 227 pounds), Ashland
 Linebacker - Isiah Robertson (senior, 6'3", 220 pounds), Southern
 Defensive back - Nathaniel Allen (senior, 6'2", 185 pounds), Texas Southern
 Defensive back - Joe Cichy (senior, 6'0", 194 pounds), North Dakota State
 Defensive back - Vivian Lee (senior, 6'3", 200 pounds), Prairie View A&M

Second team

Offense
 Quarterback - Dan Pastorini, Santa Clara
 Running back - Leroy Byars, Alcorn A&M
 Running back - Calvin Harrell, Arkansas State
 Running back - Steve Pelot, South Dakota
 End - Vince Green, Troy State
 End - Chris Myers, Kenyon
 Tackle - Rod Cason, Angelo State
 Tackle - John Morring, Tampa
 Guard - Sterling Allen, Wofford
 Guard - Jim Kalill, Hawaii
 Guard - Billy Manning, Grambling

Defense
 Defensive end - Vern Den Herder, Central (Iowa)
 Defensive end - Gary Gustafson, Montana State
 Defensive tackle - Bill Bibbee, Wittenberg
 Defensive tackle - Dave Pureifory, Eastern Michigan
 Middle guard - Ernest Holmes, Texas Southern
 Linebacker - Tim Kearney, Northern Michigan
 Linebacker - Don McLean, North Dakota
 Linebacker - Robert Young, Texas A&I
 Defensive back - Walter Huntley, Trinity (Texas)
 Defensive back - Cleophus Johnson, Alcorn A&M
 Defensive back - Dennis Meyer, Arkansas State

Third team

Offense
 Quarterback - Tim Von Dulm, Portland State
 Running back - Dom Flora, Bridgwater (Virginia)
 Running back - Chuck Hall, Delaware
 Running back - Rick Thompson, East Central (Oklahoma)
 End - Frank Lewis, Grambling
 End - Mike Savoy, Black Hills State
 Tackle - Len Gotshalk, Humboldt State
 Tackle - Dan Green, North Dakota State
 Guard - Ross Bolce, Pacific Lutheran
 Guard - Bill Soucy, Boston University
 Center - Bruce Jackson, Trinity (Texas)

Defense
 Defensive end - Kelvin Korver, Northwestern (Iowa)
 Defensive end - Ronald Leigh, Elizabeth City
 Defensive tackle - Sammy Gellerstedt, Tampa
 Defensive tackle - Larry Miller, Montana
 Middle guard - Roosevelt Manning, Northeast Oklahoma
 Linebacker - Pete Contaldi, Montclair State
 Linebacker - Terry Giltner, Tennessee-Martin
 Linebacker - Aubrey Johnson, Northeast Missouri
 Defensive back - Steve Endemano, Claremont-Mudd
 Defensive back - Lynn Ferguson, Drexel
 Defensive back - Tom Williams, Willamette

See also
 1970 College Football All-America Team

References

Little All-America college football team
Little All-America college football team
Little All-America college football teams